The 1932 Baylor Bears football team represented Baylor University in the Southwest Conference (SWC) during the 1932 college football season. In their seventh season under head coach Morley Jennings, the Bears compiled a 3–5–1 record (1–4–1 against conference opponents), tied for fifth place in the conference, and were outscored by opponents by a combined total of 92 to 77. They played their home games at Carroll Field in Waco, Texas. Arthur "Dub" Norton was the team captain.

Schedule

References

Baylor
Baylor Bears football seasons
Baylor Bears football